Ivan Trifonov (born 15 May 1948) is a former Soviet cyclist. He competed in the individual road race at the 1972 Summer Olympics.

References

External links
 

1948 births
Living people
Soviet male cyclists
Olympic cyclists of the Soviet Union
Cyclists at the 1972 Summer Olympics
Place of birth missing (living people)